Robert W. Ash (born July 9, 1951) is an American former college football coach. He served as the head football coach at Juniata College in Huntingdon, Pennsylvania from 1980 to 1988, Drake University in Des Moines, Iowa from 1989 to 2006, and Montana State University in Bozeman, Montana from 2007 to 2015, compiling a career college football coaching record of 246–137–5. His record was 75–51–4 at the NCAA Division III level and 171–86–1 at the NCAA Division I-AA/FCS level.

Early life and playing career
Ash was born in Des Moines, Iowa. He played college football as quarterback at Cornell College of Mount Vernon, Iowa and earned Little All-America honors and First Team CoSIDA Academic All-America honors as a senior in 1972. Ash graduated Phi Beta Kappa in 1973, earning an NCAA Top Five Award and an NCAA Post-Graduate scholarship.

Early coaching career
After a four-year stint as an assistant coach at his alma mater, Ash was hired in 1980 as head football coach at Juniata College, an NCAA Division III school in Huntingdon, Pennsylvania. After posting a 4–5 record in his first season in 1980, Juniata posted winning marks in six of the next eight campaigns. Ash finished with a 51–36–3 record as the Indians head coach.

Drake
Ash recorded a 125–63–2 record in 18 seasons at Drake, including four Pioneer Football League (PFL) championships. He was named the PFL's Coach of the Year in 1995, 1998, and 2004. Ash ended his tenure at Drake with five consecutive winning seasons.

Ash led the Bulldogs to 7–3 and 6–4 records in his first two seasons. After posting a 4–6 mark in 1991, Ash's Drake squads stood 30–8–2 over the next four years. His 125 wins stands as the most in school history.

Montana State
Ash was hired at Montana State on June 11, 2007. Ash's Bobcats went 6–5 in his first season as coach.

In 2009 Ash, was named second vice president of the American Football Coaches Association. Per AFCA tradition, Ash moved up to first vice president in 2010 and became president in 2011 before giving way to Harvard coach Tim Murphy the following year.

In 2010, Ash guided the Bobcats to a 9–2 regular season record, including a 7–1 mark in the Big Sky Conference. MSU defeated arch rival Montana 21–16 on the road to win the conference championship and an automatic berth to the FCS postseason. Ash was named the 2010 Big Sky Conference Coach of the Year.

In 2011, Ash guided the Cats to another share of the Big Sky Conference title, sharing with the University of Montana, and going to the NCAA playoffs. The Bobcats beat the University of New Hampshire by one in the second round before losing in the quarter finals to Sam Houston State. After the season, Ash was named the 2011 Liberty Mutual FCS Coach of the Year.

The 2012 season resulted in a one loss regular season for the Bobcats, and a share of the Big Sky Conference championship, their third in three seasons. Ash was named the Region 5 co-coach of the year for 2012 by the American Football Coaches Association.

Ash was fired at the end of the 2015 season.

Arkansas
On June 2, 2016, Ash was hired by Arkansas to be the offensive analyst for head coach Bret Bielema. He served during the 2016 football season.

Championship Analytics, Inc
Rob Ash is employed as Director of Coaching Development. CAI is a company Coach Ash used while at Montana State during the 2014 and 2015 seasons. While still coaching at Montana State University Ash started pitching coaches about CAI after the 2014 season, he officially started working for CAI in January, 2017.

Head coaching record

See also
 List of college football coaches with 200 wins

References

1951 births
Living people
American football quarterbacks
Arkansas Razorbacks football coaches
Cornell Rams football coaches
Cornell Rams football players
Drake Bulldogs athletic directors
Drake Bulldogs football coaches
Juniata Eagles football coaches
Montana State Bobcats football coaches
Coaches of American football from Iowa
Players of American football from Des Moines, Iowa